Penicillium subarcticum is a species of fungus in the genus Penicillium.

References

Further reading 
 

subarcticum
Fungi described in 2002